Feldkirchen (b München) station is a railway station in the municipality of Feldkirchen, located in the Munich district in Bavaria, Germany.

References

Railway stations in Bavaria
Munich S-Bahn stations
Buildings and structures in Munich (district)
Railway stations in Germany opened in 1871
1871 establishments in Bavaria